District Superintendent may be:

District Superintendent (United Methodist Church)
A rank in the London Metropolitan Police in use from 1869 to 1886, when it was renamed Chief Constable
The full title of the rank of Superintendent (police) in many former British territories